is an anime television series based on the Sengoku Basara games originally created by CAPCOM. It began airing on July 6, 2014 on NTV and tells its own version of the story from the video game Sengoku Basara: Samurai Heroes.

Unlike the previous anime adaptations (Sengoku Basara: Samurai Kings), this series is produced by Nippon Television, VAP and Telecom Animation Film and directed by Takashi Sano, with Natsuko Takahashi handling series composition, Michinori Chiba designing the characters and Masahiro Tokuda composing the music.

Development

On the January 19, 2014 Sengoku Basara 4 Basara Matsuri 2014 event at the Nippon Seinenkan Great Hall, that a new television anime project for its Sengoku Basara franchise is in the works which later called "Sengoku Basara: Judge End".

Plot

This series begins with Tokugawa Ieyasu betraying and killing Toyotomi Hideyoshi. Several groups start forming alliances in preparation of the upcoming Battle of Sekigahara.

Music

The opening theme song is "Thunderclap" by Fear, and Loathing in Las Vegas and the ending song is "" by Chiaki Ishikawa.

Characters
Although all characters are credited with their family name first, they will be placed last in this section for better reference.

Date Clan

Takeda Clan

Tokugawa Clan

Toyotomi Clan

Uesugi Clan

Maeda Clan

Kobayakawa Clan

Hōjō Clan

Ōtomo Clan

Other Clans

Episode list

See also
List of Sengoku Basara characters (from the video game)
List of Sengoku Basara episodes

References

External links
 Sengoku Basara: End of Judgement at NTV
 Sengoku Basara: End of Judgement at Funimation
 

Anime television series based on video games
Fantasy anime and manga
Funimation
Nippon TV original programming
Samurai in anime and manga
Sengoku Basara
Sengoku period in fiction
Yomiuri Telecasting Corporation original programming